Füllbach is a river of Bavaria, Germany. It flows into the Itz in Niederfüllbach.

See also
List of rivers of Bavaria

References

Rivers of Bavaria
Coburg (district)
Rivers of Germany